The Pittsburgh Terminal Coal Company was a bituminous coal mining company based in Pittsburgh and controlled by the Mellon family. It operated mines in the Pittsburgh Coalfield, including mines in Becks Run and Horning, Pennsylvania. Unusually for that time in Pennsylvania, it hired African-American miners for some of its work.

History
The Pittsburgh Terminal Coal Company was a trust incorporated in New Jersey in 1899 by leading Pittsburgh industrialists, including Andrew W. Mellon, Henry W. Oliver, and Henry Clay Frick. Although a New Jersey corporation, it operated only in the Pittsburgh area.

Pittsburgh Terminal Coal ran numerous coal mines in Allegheny County during the early 20th century.

It operated the Darr Mine in Westmoreland County, Pennsylvania.

In 1915, it merged with the Monongahela River Consolidated Coal and Coke Company. In 1945 it merged with Consolidation Coal Company, controlled by the Rockefeller family.

Railroads
Near its beginning, the Pittsburgh Terminal Coal Company owned six collector railroads. The company assumed control of the Montour Railroad in 1901.

Labor relations

Pittsburgh Terminal Coal paid compensation in the 1929 death of their union employee John Barcoski due to a beating by three officers of the Coal and Iron Police.

The company was involved in labor disputes with John L. Lewis and the United Mine Workers.

See also

References

External links

Coal companies of the United States
Mining in Pennsylvania
Defunct mining companies of the United States
Defunct companies based in Pennsylvania
History of Allegheny County, Pennsylvania
Non-renewable resource companies disestablished in 1945
Defunct coal mining companies
Defunct energy companies of the United States
1945 mergers and acquisitions
Energy companies disestablished in 1945
1899 establishments in Pennsylvania
Non-renewable resource companies established in 1899